Bollywood Queen is a British Indian take on the William Shakespeare play Romeo and Juliet, directed by Jeremy Wooding and starring Preeya Kalidas and James McAvoy. Produced by Jeremy Wooding, the film was released in 2003.

Plot
Geena is a Bollywood fanatic from a respectable Gujarati family. She has finished school, and is at university doing a business studies course. She is dating Dilip, an ambitious computer whizz, but wants her love life to be like it is in the movies. However, Dilip only wants sex. Geena's family owns Ganesh Global, a clothing company which imports materials and saris from India. Geena has a part-time job working in the shop. She is also in a secret band with two other girls, Anjali and Neeta.

Jay is a young guy from Somerset who joins his brother Dean in London, who also works in the clothing industry, for someone called Frank Ian McShane. He owns a guitar, of which he is extremely protective.

One day, when Geena is walking along the road, Jay and his brother happen to be managing some poles. One of the poles nearly falls on Geena, but Jay lunges at her and pushes her out of the way before it can crush her. Geena, disgusted at this, hurries along, leaving her phone behind. Jay sees the phone and takes it, but his brother Dean repossesses it. Jay then takes the phone back and gives it to Geena, who then thanks him for saving her life. She then gives him her phone number, and they begin to meet up regularly.

The two start to fall in love, meeting up in secret regularly and hiding from Geena's family. However, Dean discovers the affair and launches an attack on Ganesh Global. One of Geena's brothers also sees the two together, and Geena gets into trouble with her family. Her brother then takes away her phone. Geena's brothers then beat Jay up, leaving him bleeding. Jay and Geena then run away together and escape their family. Dean is in hospital, and Jay visits him and takes away all his money.

Eventually, Jay and Geena return to London and Jay settles his dispute with his father and brother. Geena then turns up for her relative's wedding, dressed in Indian attire, and sings with her band. She then attempts to reunite with her family, and it is revealed her brother, Sanjay is a criminal, and is handling illegal suits, and that her brother, Tariq is gay. Jay and Geena then leave in the bride and groom's carriage, and her mother says to her father, "She'll be back."

Cast
 Preeya Kalidas as Geena
 James McAvoy as Jay
 Ray Panthaki as Anil
 Ciarán McMenamin as Dean
 Kat Bhathena as Anjali
 Ian McShane as Frank
 Amerjit Deu as Sanjay
 Karen David as Neeta
 Lalita Ahmed as Geena's mother
 Andy Beckwith as Johnny
 Jo Cameron Brown as Anita
 Saraj Chaudhry as Tariq
 Giada Dobrzenska as Club Kid
 Ronny Jhutti as Dilip
 Tajpal Rathore as Family member
 Ranu Setna as Uncle Ganesh
 Faizaan Shurai as Factory Worker
 Elsa de Belilovsky as Elsa

Awards and nominations
British Independent Film Awards
Jeremy Wooding - nominated for  Douglas Hickox Award (Best Debut Director)

References

External links

2002 films
2000s musical films
2002 romantic drama films
British romantic drama films
British Indian films
Films set in London
Films based on Romeo and Juliet
Modern adaptations of works by William Shakespeare
2000s English-language films
2000s British films
2000s Hindi-language films
2002 multilingual films
British multilingual films